WV2 or WV-2 may refer to:
 Lockheed WV-2 Warning Star, a surveillance aircraft
 West Virginia's 2nd congressional district
 West Virginia Route 2
 WorldView-2, a commercial Earth observation satellite
 WV2, a postcode district in Wolverhampton, England; see WV postcode area
 Nickname of boxer Wilfredo Vázquez, Jr.